Serbolusatian may refer to:
 Serbolusatian languages (Sorbian languages)
 Serbolusatians (Sorbs)